Mahuadanr Wolf Sanctuary is a wildlife sanctuary located in Latehar district of Jharkhand. It is part of Betla National Park. It was declared to be a wildlife sanctuary in 1976 for the protection of the  Indian wolf. It is the only wolf sanctuary in the country.

History
In 1976, the sanctuary was declared a wolf sanctuary for the protection of the Indian wolf (Canis lupus pallipes) population. It is part of Betla National Park. It is spread over approx. 63 square kilometres. There are large numbers of wolf dens in the park, where the packs nest and rear their young, and where males court females during the breeding season, between November and February. According to the first count in 1979, there were 49 wolves in the sanctuary. The total population increased substantially over the next several decades, reaching 568 by 2004. In 2009, there were sadly only 58 wolves counted in the sanctuary. There were 120 wolves in 2020.

References

National parks in Jharkhand
Latehar district
Chota Nagpur dry deciduous forests